Salman Zaman (born October 2, 1979 in Muharraq) is a Bahraini rifle sport shooter. Zaman represented Bahrain at the 2008 Summer Olympics in Beijing, where he competed in the men's 50 m rifle prone shooting. He finished only in thirty-seventh place for the qualifying rounds, with a total score of 588 points.

Zaman is currently a member of Bahrain Shooting Club in Manama.

References

External links
ISSF Profile
NBC 2008 Olympics profile

Bahraini male sport shooters
Living people
Olympic shooters of Bahrain
Shooters at the 2008 Summer Olympics
1979 births
Shooters at the 2002 Asian Games
Shooters at the 2006 Asian Games
Shooters at the 2014 Asian Games
Asian Games competitors for Bahrain